McSpicy is the name used by the fast-food restaurant chain McDonald's for burgers in various markets. In Singapore, a chicken burger called the McSpicy is the chain's top-selling burger.

Chicken leg burger 

The McSpicy burger is sold in Singapore, Hong Kong, the Philippines and Indonesia contains a spiced fried-chicken cutlet made of leg meat, accompanied by lettuce and mayonnaise. The burger was introduced in Singapore in 1999.

In October 2020, the burger was introduced as a permanent menu item in Australia after initially being brought in temporarily earlier in the year. The burger has also been sold in McDonald's global headquarters restaurant in Chicago, on a rotating basis. 

A McSpicy chicken burger is sold in India as part of a range of products using the McSpicy name.

A McSpicy Deluxe, with cheese and tomato, was sold in Singapore, while a burger of the same name is sold in Vietnam with tomato.

Other uses of the McSpicy name 

The Lamb McSpicy was launched in the UK in May 1999 for a promotional period. In 2021, McDonalds UK launched a burger called the McSpicy, but made with chicken breast in a crispy coating, lettuce and a creamy sauce.

In South Korea the McSpicy Shanghai Burger was developed specifically for the Korean market; it is also made with chicken breast.

In India, McDonald's launched the McSpicy Chicken Burger, McSpicy Paneer Burger, McSpicy Chicken Wrap and McSpicy Paneer Wrap in 2011. The McSpicy Chicken Burger is made from chicken thigh. After its introduction, the McSpicy Paneer Burger was so popular that restaurants sold out every week. In May 2020, McDonald's India added a fried chicken product to its menu using the McSpicy name: McSpicy Fried Chicken.
 
In May 2017, a vegetarian McSpice burger was introduced in Norway; without the cheese it is vegan-friendly.

References 

Products introduced in 1999
McDonald's foods
Fast food hamburgers
Chicken sandwiches